Semibratovsky is a rural locality (a khutor) in Profsoyuzninskoye Rural Settlement, Danilovsky District, Volgograd Oblast, Russia. The population was 49 as of 2010.

Geography 
Semibratovsky is located in steppe, on the north-west bank of the Bobrovoye Lake, 18 km northwest of Danilovka (the district's administrative centre) by road. Profsoyuznik is the nearest rural locality.

References 

Rural localities in Danilovsky District, Volgograd Oblast